In Canada, temporary residency applies to those who are not Canadian citizens but are legally in Canada for a temporary purpose, including international students, foreign workers, and tourists.

Whereas "Permanent Residence" (PR) is a requirement for Canadian citizenship, temporary residency has little to do with citizenship, in that one cannot go from temporary resident to citizen without first going through another program. More specifically, the classes of Temporary Resident Documents under IMM1442 are as follows:

 Temporary Student — study permit (also IMM1208),
Temporary Worker — work permit (also IMM 1102),
Temporary Visitor — visitor record (also IMM 1097),
Temporary Resident Permit holder who require the permit to overcome inadmissibility issues

Some foreign nationals require a Temporary Resident Visa to visit Canada.

Temporary labour migration
Unlike applicants for permanent residence, the Canada's Temporary Foreign Worker Program (TFWP) does not have a cap on the number of applicants admitted; instead, numbers are dictated primarily by employer demand.

From 2002 and 2011, the number of temporary foreign workers (TFW) residing in Canada had a three-fold increase, from about 101,000 to 300,000. For the first time in 2007, overall temporary migration overtook permanent migration, with the highest increase being in the number of TFWs that entered the country, and within that the largest increase accounted for those in lower-skilled occupations in farming, caregiving, service & retail, clerical work, manufacturing and construction. There was also a 73% increase in the number of entries and re-entries into the country in the 2002-2008 period.

The expansion of the TFWP to accommodate workers in lower-skilled occupations has been influenced by general increased employer demand of lower-skilled workers, particularly in the oil, gas, and construction sectors. In 2002, the pilot project for Hiring Foreign Workers in Occupations that Require Lower Levels of Formal Training was introduced. The project has since evolved to better suit employers needs, for example by increasing the length of the work permit from 12 to 24 months. However this is not the case for those entering through 2 occupation-specific programs: the Live-in Caregiver Program (LCP) or the Seasonal Agricultural Workers Program (SAWP).

Seasonal Agricultural Worker Program

Implemented in 1966, more than 29,000 agricultural workers enter Canada every year through this program from the Caribbean and Mexico. The program exists as an agreement between sending countries and the Canadian government to provide seasonal agricultural workers during peak Canadian production. Particular sectors that report labour shortages are often the fruits, vegetables and horticultural sectors. Those who enter through this program can work for a maximum of 8 months per year.

In 2009, half of agricultural migrants were from Mexico (about 15,800 people).  Among these migrants, 75% have been re-entering the program for 4 years or more, while 57%, for 6 years or more.

Live-in Caregiver Program

Replacing the foreign domestic movement (FDM) in 1992, the Live-in Caregiver program accepts between 2,500 and 3,500 caregivers each year. According to Immigration, Refugees and Citizenship Canada, "Live-in caregivers are individuals who are qualified to provide care for children, elderly persons or persons with disabilities in private homes without supervision."

Applicants to the program must meet certain criteria, some of which include: high school education, equivalent to Canadian standards, language ability, as well as a written contract by an employer and Employment and Social Development Canada approval that labour shortages necessitate hiring abroad.

Recruitment into this program is seen to be racialized and gendered, as 95.6% of Canada's live-in caregivers are women from the Philippines. Despite this, and unlike the SAWP, no formal labour agreement exists to govern these migratory flows. Rather, an informal Filipino community network, as well as the Philippine government's labour export strategy facilitates and regulates the continuous migratory flows between the two countries. Also unlike those who enter through the SAWP, LCP applicants can apply for permanent residency at the end of their 2-year contract.

International Experience Canada
The International Experience Canada (IEC) program provides young nationals from select countries, with the opportunity to travel and work in Canada for a maximum of 24 months. Interested candidates are randomly selected depending on the spots available for their country of origin and for the category in which they are eligible.

There are three categories under IEC:
 Working Holiday,
 Young Professionals, and
 International Co-op Internship.
In order to be able to participate in the IEC, the country or territory that the candidate is a citizen of must have an agreement with Canada, allowing them to apply for an IEC work permit.

Alternatively, if they do not belong to any such country or territory, they must be able to make use of a recognized organization (RO). ROs, for the purposes of IEC, include: AIESEC, GO International, International Association for the Exchange of Students for Technical Experience (IAESTE), International Rural Exchange (IRE), Memorial University of Newfoundland (MUN), Stepwest, WAP Working Holidays, University of British Columbia, and University of New Brunswick.

Furthermore, the candidate will also have to successfully meet the eligibility requirements for their country or territory of citizenship as well as of the specific pool that they are applying for. Usually, countries that have an agreement with Canada as to the IEC program allow candidates to participate in the program only 1 time. Other countries, though allowing a candidate to apply 2 times, will require the candidates to apply in different pools each of the times that they apply for the IEC.

Those holding a refugee travel document that has been issued by a country with a youth mobility agreement with Canada are not eligible to participate in the IEC program. While dependents cannot be taken along on the IEC, dependents might apply for visiting, studying, or working Canada. The applications are to be assessed separately and not along with that of the IEC candidate.

Criticism and debate
The exploitation of migrant labour has been a key issue amongst labour and civil society groups. Many have suggested that the structure of Canadian temporary migration programs, particularly the LCP, perpetuate social and economic inequalities in the long-term. There are little provincial employment standards regarding the recruitment and monitoring of the LCP, which leaves migrant workers vulnerable to exploitation.  At present, only the province of British Columbia requires that workers be registered by their employers under the Domestic Workers' Registry. Employment agencies, on the other hand, are only regulated in two provinces, British Columbia, and Alberta, and their regulation only amounts to operating licensing requirements.

The lack of systemic regulation makes it difficult for contract violations to be contested.  Under the law, contracts should specify total work hours, vacation time, wages, and benefits.  However, in a study conducted by a Montreal organization, PINAY, together with the McGill University School of Social Work, it was found that in 25% of the 148 live-in caregivers studied, employers did not sign a contract at all, and 43% claimed that they weren't paid for overtime work.

Another issue with temporary migrants is the limited mobility afforded to them within the confines of their stipulated contracts. What sets the LCP apart from other Temporary Foreign Worker Programs is that applicants are required to have Grade 12 education as well as domestic service training. Research has even found that a large number of those applying through the LCP program have had university-level education, and training as registered nurses from their origin countries. However, due to the live-in requirement and the length of the LCP contract, deskilling occurs, wherein educational qualifications and training once held by immigrants prior to entering the program are not utilized or developed. This leads to downward occupational mobility as re-entry into the labour market with a skilled position becomes difficult upon the end of the contract, and once permanent residency is achieved.

Since the Canadian economy entered recession in 2008, temporary foreign workers have proven to be the most vulnerable to job losses. In January 2009 Service Canada introduced tighter restrictions for employers who wish to recruit temporary residents. In April 2013, the temporary foreign worker program was thrust into the national spotlight by a Canadian Broadcasting Corporation news article on outsourcing by the Royal Bank of Canada in which full-time RBC employees were replaced with temporary foreign workers.

See also
 Citizenship and Immigration Canada
 Immigration to Canada
 Canada immigration statistics
 Permanent resident (Canada)

References

External links
 Citizenship and Immigration Canada - Visiting Canada
Citizenship and Immigration Canada - Work in Canada
Citizenship and Immigration Canada - Statistics
Citizenship and Immigration Canada - Swics

Canadian immigration law
Residency